The J/24 is an international One-Design and Midget Ocean Racing Club trailerable keelboat class built by J/Boats and defined by World Sailing.  The J/24 was created to fulfill the diverse needs of recreational sailors such as cruising, one design racing, day sailing, and handicap racing.

The J/24 class has more than 50,000 people sailing 5,500 boats worldwide; is established in 27 countries with well and is the world's most popular one design keelboat.

Production
In the summer of 1975 Rodney Johnstone designed and built hull number 1 in his garage in Stonington, Connecticut.  "Ragtime" would serve as the master mold for the subsequent hulls.  This design allowed him to start the very successful J-Boat company with his brother Bob Johnstone. By 1978 the class was popular enough to hold a one-design regatta in Key West with twenty boats on the line.

New boat manufacturing has been done by multiple companies around the world in UK,  France (only 5), Croatia, USA, Italy and Argentina. In the US, J/24s are built by US Watercraft. Italy could still build new boats.

As of January 2009, approximately 5,475 J/24s have been produced. Approximately 20 new boats were produced in 2008. The average price of a complete, new boat without sails was approximately £20,000. (31,370 USD)

Design

The J/24 is a racing keelboat, built predominantly of fiberglass, with wood trim. It has a fractional sloop rig, a raked stem, a plumb transom, a transom-hung rudder controlled by a tiller and a fixed fin keel. It displaces  and carries  of lead ballast.

The boat is normally fitted with a small  outboard motor for docking and maneuvering.

The design has sleeping accommodation for four people, with a double "V"-berth in the bow cabin and two straight settees in the main cabin. The galley is located on the starboard side just aft of the bow cabin. The head is located just aft of the bow cabin on the starboard side stowed under a table.

For sailing downwind the design may be equipped with a symmetrical spinnaker.

Operational history

The international authority for the class is World Sailing, which cooperates with the International J/24 Class Association on all matters regarding the rules. Interpretations of these rules shall be made by the ISAF, which in coming to its decision may consult the International J/24 Class Association and the copyright holder. The International J24 Class Association (IJCA) has the sole authority worldwide for the conduct and management of the International J/24 Class. IJCA is a "not-for-profit" organization.

One reason for its popularity is that it is fairly easy and inexpensive to acquire a used boat and gear due to the large number of boats produced. There are 136 active fleets in the US alone, which offer a lot of race competition. This makes the J/24 a popular boat for beginners and experienced sailors.

In a 2010 review Steve Henkel wrote, "The boat is light and sails like a big dinghy. In anything over ten knots of air, 'rail meat' is needed to keep the boat on her feet going upwind, but the ride can be thrilling, We cruised her occasionally, and once or twice trailered her to Newport for a week’s cruise of Narragansett Bay, where there was a public park with a launching crane available. But we wouldn't recommend the boat if cruising is your main aim. Best features: This is a great boat to race if you like to socialize and want to learn how to race well. Worst features: With her 4-foot draft, launching at any but the steepest launching ramps is out of the question, Luckily, most places where J/24s are raced have access to a crane. The /24 has an eyebolt on the top of the keel for shackling to a crane hook. The crane can also be used to lift and set the mast, which steps not on deck but on the keel."

World Championships

See also
Related development
 J/22
 J/27
 J/32

Similar sailboats
Achilles 24
Albin Express
C&C 24
C&C SR 25
Challenger 24
Kirby 25
O'Day 25
Merit 25
Mirage 24
Nutmeg 24
San Juan 24
Seidelmann 245
Tanzer 25
Tonic 23
US Yachts US 25

References

External links

 

 
Keelboats
1970s sailboat type designs
Sailboat type designs by Rod Johnstone
Sailboat types built in the United States
Sailboat types built by J/Boats